Dinesh Das  (16 September 1913 – 13 March 1985) was a Bengali poet.

He was born in his maternal home at Chetla in Alipore, a locality on the bank of Adi Ganga creek. When he was in Class IX, at around 15 years age, he became involved in secret revolutionary Indian independence movement. He also became involved in Mohandas Karamchand Gandhi's Salt Satyagraha movement which hampered his formal education. However he passed Matriculation Examination in 1930, and I.A. in 1932 from the South Suburban College (now Asutosh College). In 1933, he was admitted to B.A. in Scottish Church College. In 1934, first poem "Sraboney" was published in Desh. However he could not complete his B.A. due to his revolutionary and literary activities. In 1935, he took a job at Khayerbari Tea Estate and moved to Kurseong. There he became disillusioned with Gandhism and on return to Calcutta next year, he became inspired by communism and read writings of Karl Marx, Friedrich Engels and Ralph Fox. 
In 1937, he created a stir with his poem Kaste (Sickle). He immortalized Kolkata's Clive Street in one of his poems:. He was a nice guy.

Here, in a hundred snake-like veins,
Streams of people come and go.
Through these shrunken veins the blood,
Of the country must flow.
O Mighty City's beating heart,
O Clive Street of Bengal,
A thousand dumb veins freeze to make,
The cornerstone of your high hall.

Works
Kabita  (Poems)
Bhukhmichhil  (Hunger Procession)
Kancher Manush  (Glass Humans)
Ram gechhe Banabase  (Ram is in Forest Exile)
Kaste  (Scythe; also part of the symbol of the Communist Party): an allegory on modern industrial life

References

External links 

 D 
1913 births
1985 deaths
20th-century Bengali poets
Asutosh College alumni
Scottish Church College alumni
University of Calcutta alumni
People from Alipore
20th-century Indian poets
Bengali male poets
Indian male poets
Poets from West Bengal
20th-century Indian male writers 
 Writers from Kolkata
inesh Das Milansagar (Bengali)